Boezinge is a village in the municipality of Ypres in the Belgian province of West Flanders. Boezinge can be reached via the N369 road in the direction of Diksmuide. It was an independent municipality until 1977.

History
Boezinge was first mentioned in 1119 as Boesigha. The village was an heerlijkheid. Until 1556, it was part of the diocese of Terwaan.

In World War I, the village belonged to the Ypres Salient, which made it the site of the Battles of Ypres between German and Allied forces. Today there are memorials and war cemeteries in the area, many of which are maintained by the Commonwealth War Graves Commission.

In 1970, the municipality merged with Zuidschote, and in 1977, it was merged into Ypres.

Commemoration of World War I

Yorkshire Trench
In the 1990s an original British trench system ("Yorkshire Trench") was discovered by amateur archaeologists, on the site of an industrial estate near the village. Yorkshire Trench was a first line trench for about one year between summer or autumn 1916 until the summer of 1917. In spring of 1917, 173rd Tunnelling Company added a deep dugout to the existing trench. The completed Yorkshire Trench dugout then served as headquarters for the 13th and 16th Battalions of the Royal Welch Fusiliers at the start of the Battle of Passchendaele later that year. The BEF had decided to carry out all operations in the offensive of summer 1917 from deep dugouts. East of the Ypres Canal in the close vicinity of Yorkshire Trench there were several more dugouts, seven of which - all south and southeast of Yorkshire Trench - were finished by the 173rd or 179th Tunnelling Companies. Of these, Yorkshire Trench, Butt 18, Nile Trench and Heading Lane Dugout were double battalion headquarters, Bridge 6 was a brigade headquarters, and Lancashire Farm Dugout contained two battalion and two brigade headquarters. The condition of the ground made digging the deep dugouts extremely difficult and dangerous. Work had to be carried out silently and secretly, facing an observant enemy who was only a few hundred metres away. About 180 dugout sites have been located in the Ypres Salient and in the 1990s some of them were entered, at least in part. 
Yorkshire Trench was rediscovered by amateur archaeologists and systematically excavated in 1998. Although the area is now part of a large industrial estate, the location was opened to the public in 2003 Yorkshire Trench is located close to the John McCrae memorial site at Essex Farm.

John McCrae Memorial Site

Welsh Memorial Park

War cemeteries
 Artillery Wood Cemetery, where the Welsh poet Hedd Wyn and the Irish poet Francis Ledwidge are buried 
 Bard Cottage Cemetery
 Boezinge Churchyard war graves
 Colne Valley Cemetery
 Dragoon Camp Cemetery
 Duhallow ADS Cemetery
 Essex Farm Cemetery
 La Belle Alliance Cemetery
 No Man's Cot Cemetery
 Talana Farm Cemetery
 Welsh Cemetery (Caesar's Nose)

The Castle of Boezinge (Boesinghe)

The estate was destroyed during the first world war in July 1917 and rebuilt after the war.

In the private park lies a British command post.

References

External links

Ypres
Populated places in West Flanders